Aitkin Municipal Airport , also known as Steve Kurtz Field, is a public use airport located two nautical miles (4 km) northeast of the central business district of Aitkin, a city in Aitkin County, Minnesota, United States. It is owned by the County & City of Aitkin.

Although most U.S. airports use the same three-letter location identifier for the FAA and IATA, this airport is assigned AIT by the FAA but has no designation from the IATA (which assigned AIT to Aitutaki, Cook Islands).

Aitkin County and the city opened the airport in the early 1950s with a single grass runway.  The runway was paved and lighted in 1975.

The airport is named after the owner and founder of Steve's Flight Service, Steve Kurtz.

Facilities and aircraft 
It has two runways: 16/34 with a 4,018 x 75 ft (1,225 x 23 m) asphalt pavement and 8/26 with a 3,335 x 150 ft (1,017 x 46 m) turf surface.

For the 12-month period ending June 30, 2007, the airport had 16,000 general aviation aircraft operations, an average of 43 per day. At that time there were 47 aircraft based at this airport:
94% single-engine, 4% multi-engine and 2% glider.

References

External links 
 at Minnesota DOT Airport Directory
Aitkin Aviation Inc., the airport's fixed-base operator

Airports in Minnesota
Buildings and structures in Aitkin County, Minnesota
Transportation in Aitkin County, Minnesota